The 1992–93 Umaglesi Liga was the fourth season of top-tier football in Georgia. It began on 9 August 1992 and ended on 21 June 1993. Dinamo Tbilisi were the defending champions.

Locations

League standings

Results

Top goalscorers

See also
1992–93 Pirveli Liga
1992–93 Georgian Cup

References
Georgia - List of final tables (RSSSF)

Erovnuli Liga seasons
1
Georgia